On September 11, 1973, Salvador Allende, president of Chile, died from gunshot wounds during a coup d'état led by Augusto Pinochet, commander-in-chief of the Chilean Army. After decades of suspicions that Allende might have been assassinated by the Chilean Armed Forces, a Chilean court authorized the exhumation and autopsy of Allende's remains in 2011. A team of international experts examined the remains and concluded that Allende had shot himself with an AK-47 assault rifle. In December 2011, the judge in charge of the investigation affirmed the experts' findings and ruled Allende's death a suicide. On September 11, 2012, the 39th anniversary of Allende's death, a Chilean appeals court unanimously upheld the trial court's ruling, officially closing the case.

Isabel Allende Bussi, the daughter of Salvador Allende and a former member of the Senate of Chile, stated that the Allende family had long accepted that the former president shot himself. She told the BBC, "The report conclusions are consistent with what we already believed. When faced with extreme circumstances, he made the decision of taking his own life, instead of being humiliated."

Carlos Altamirano, who was close to Allende, recalls that prior to the coup, Allende would have dismissed his suggestion to seek refuge in a loyalist regiment and fight back from there. In Altamirano's words Allende also rejected the option "to do as so many dictators and presidents of Latin America, that is to grab a briefcase full of money and take a plane out the country." Allende was an admirer of José Manuel Balmaceda, a Chilean president who died by suicide in face of his defeat in the Chilean Civil War of 1891. According to Altamirano, Allende was "obsessed with the attitude of Balmaceda."

In an interview with David Frost in 2013, Isabel Allende said that at a family lunch nine days before his death, Salvador Allende had said that he would either stay until the end of this term of presidency or he would be taken out feet first.

Death
On September 11, 1973, just prior to the capture of Palacio de La Moneda (the presidential palace) by military units loyal to Pinochet, President Salvador Allende made his famous farewell speech to Chileans on live radio (Radio Magallanes). The president spoke of his love for Chile and of his deep faith in its future. He also stated that, as he was committed to Chile, he would not take an easy way out or be used as a propaganda tool by those he called "traitors" (accepting an offer of safe passage, like Carlos Altamirano). The radio address was made while gunfire and explosions were clearly audible in the background.

Shortly afterwards, an official announcement declared that he had gone to war with an AK-47 rifle. Allende's corpse was carried out of La Moneda Palace wrapped in a Bolivian poncho by soldiers and fire fighters.

His body was sent to Hospital Militar arriving about 17:30. Among those present during the autopsy was one of Allende's former classmates in university. The autopsy also recorded his death as a suicide.

Allende's weapon had been given to him as a gift by Fidel Castro. It bore a golden plate engraved: "To my good friend Salvador from Fidel, who by different means tries to achieve the same goals."

Official version
At approximately 1:50 PM local time, President Allende ordered the defenders  of the La Moneda Palace to surrender. The defenders then formed a line from the second floor, down the stairs and onto the Morande street door. The president went along this queue, from the ground floor up the stairs, shaking hands and thanking everyone personally for their support in that difficult moment. At the end of the queue, Allende turned toward the Independence salon, located in the north-east side of the Palace's second floor.

At the same time, Dr. Patricio Guijón (a member of La Moneda's infirmary staff) himself decided to return upstairs to recover his gas-mask as a souvenir. He heard a noise, and opened the door of the Independence salon in time to see the president shoot himself with his AK-47. From the other side of the salon and through an open door, Dr. José Quiroga, Arsenio Poupin, a member of the cabinet, Enrique Huerta, a palace functionary, two detectives from the Presidential security detail, and some GAPs (Presidential Security) were able to see the moment of death, or arrive a few seconds afterwards, attracted by the noise.

Witnesses
All sources seem to agree that at least the following witnesses were present:
Dr. Patricio Guijón – member of the Presidential Medical Staff – Survived
Dr. José Quiroga – member of the Presidential Medical Staff – Survived
Arsenio Poupin Oissel – Presidential Advisor and member of the cabinet – Executed a few days later
Enrique Huerta Corvalán – Palace Intendant (governor) – Executed a few days later
David Garrido – Detective (Presidential Security Detail) – Survived
Ricardo Pincheira – Detective (Presidential Security Detail) – Survived
Pablo Manuel Zepeda Camillieri – GAP (Presidential Security) – Survived

Of these witnesses, only Guijón spoke about the events immediately after they happened, and was roundly vilified for doing so. Some sources misattribute Guijón's declarations to "Allende's personal doctor", Enrique Paris Roa, who was at La Moneda not in his professional role but as a member of Allende's cabinet. He does not appear to have made any such statement as he was executed shortly afterwards. The other witnesses kept silent until after the restoration of democracy in Chile, as they believed (according to their own statements) that to corroborate the version of a suicide would in some measure downgrade Allende's sacrifice and lend support to the military regime.

Of the two doctors from the Moneda Palace infirmary who witnessed the suicide, Patricio Guijón made a statement at the time. However, Dr. José Quiroga only confirmed the details in 1999.

Controversy
During the subsequent years of the Pinochet regime, there existed a legitimate controversy about whether plotters of the coup d'état had assassinated Allende. The definitive finding of suicide by international experts and the Chilean courts in 2011 seems to have put the controversy to rest. Almost all claims of an ongoing "controversy" regarding Allende's death seem to predate the 2011 investigations and the factual record left in its wake.

Fidel Castro, who had given President Allende the AK-47 used as the suicide weapon, provides an example of the speculation and political posturing that grew out of Allende's death and the Pinochet coup d'état. On 28 September 1973 (only two weeks after Allende's death), Castro told a Cuban crowd in Havana's Plaza de la Revolución that Allende had died in La Moneda wrapped in a Chilean flag, firing at Pinochet troops with Fidel's rifle. Over the coming decades, the Cuban leader would continue to make public addresses using this version of events.
Castro's public statements formed the basis of Robinson Rojas' 1975 book The murder of Allende and the end of the Chilean way to socialism. Rojas asserted that the Chilean president had been killed by Pinochet's military forces while defending the palace.

With the peaceful transition to democracy in Chile in 1990, the view that Allende died by suicide began to gain popular acceptance as different testimonies confirming the details of the suicide have become available in press and in documentary interviews. Likewise, members of Allende's immediate family including his wife and his daughter, have never disputed that it was a suicide. A further example of pre-2011 controversializing is found in Chilean doctor Luis Ravanal's 2008 article published in the magazine El Periodista stating that Allende's wounds were "not compatible" with suicide. Asked to comment on Dr. Ravanal's hypothesis, the Chilean congresswoman Isabel Allende, the President's daughter, said that the suicide version is the correct one.

In late January 2011, a Chilean judge opened an investigation into the death of Salvador Allende together with hundreds of other possible human rights abuses committed during the 1973 coup that brought Augusto Pinochet to power. In May, Allende's remains were exhumed by order of a Chilean court in furtherance of a "criminal investigation into the death of Allende." On May 31, 2011, before the court-ordered autopsy had been completed, Televisión Nacional de Chile (TVN) reported that a top-secret military account of Allende's death had been discovered in the home of a former military justice official. The 300-page document was only found when the house was destroyed in the 2010 Chilean earthquake. After reviewing the report, two forensic experts told TVN "that they are inclined to conclude that Allende was assassinated."

Results of the autopsy were officially released in mid-July 2011. The team of Chilean medical experts conducting and reviewing the autopsy results confirmed that Salvador Allende had died from self-inflicted gunshot wounds. The autopsy results indicated that Allende had died after shooting himself with an AK-47 received as a gift from Fidel Castro. The shots tore off the top of Allende's head, killing him instantly, because the rifle had been set to automatic fire. The Guardian, a leading UK newspaper, reported that the "scientific autopsy" had confirmed that "Salvador Allende committed suicide during the 1973 coup that toppled his socialist government." According to The Guardian:

Notes

References

External links
La Tercera, Chilean newspaper, September 11, 1973 
La Tercera, El Once, includes news of different newspaper of days previous to the coup 
Las 24 horas que estremecieron a Chile. Detailed minute-by-minute account of the events of September 11, 1973 by historian Ascanio Cavallo, on the site of La Tercera. 
Salvador Allende's "Last Words"  (with English translation.) The transcript of the last radio broadcast of Chilean President Salvador Allende, made on 11 September 1973, at 9:10 AM. MP3 audio available here.
  September 11, 1973: President overthrown in Chile coup, BBC News "On this Day", undated. Accessed 22 September 2006.

1973 in Chile
Death conspiracy theories
Allende, Salvador
Salvador Allende
Suicides by firearm in Chile